Mussab Al-Laham is a Jordanian footballer who plays for Al-Hussein and the Jordan national football team.  
 
Mussab is a nephew of one of the former stars of Al-Ramtha Bilal Al-Laham.

International career
The first match Mussab played with the Jordan national senior team was against Palestine on 11 December 2011 in the 2011 Pan Arab Games which resulted in a 4-1 win for Jordan.

International goals

With U-22

With Senior

International career statistics

References

External links 
 
 Profile on Kooora 
 AL LAHHAM Musab on Arabgames

1991 births
Living people
Jordanian footballers
Jordan international footballers
Association football forwards
Al-Ramtha SC players
Al-Hussein SC (Irbid) players
Al-Orobah FC players
Najran SC players
Muaither SC players
Jordanian Pro League players
Qatari Second Division players
Saudi First Division League players
Saudi Professional League players
Expatriate footballers in Saudi Arabia
Expatriate footballers in Qatar
Jordanian expatriate sportspeople in Saudi Arabia
Jordanian expatriate sportspeople in Qatar
Jordanian expatriate footballers